Statistics of the Cambodian League for the 2008 season.

Clubs
Khemara Keila
National Defense
Phu Chung Neak
Nagacorp FC
Phnom Penh Empire (it was called Hello United)
Post Tel Club
Preah Khan Reach
Build Bright United
Moha Garuda
Kirivong Sok Sen Chey

League standings

References
Cambodia - List of final tables (RSSSF)

C-League seasons
Cambodia
Cambodia
1